A list of active and extinct volcanoes in the Pacific Ocean.

List

See also

List of volcanoes in the Hawaiian – Emperor seamount chain

References

Volcanoes of the Pacific Ocean
Pacific Ocean
Volcanoes of Oceania